Sandra Friedli (born 25 October 1974) is a Swiss slalom canoeist who competed from the early 1990s to the early 2000s (decade).

She won a bronze medal in the K1 event at the 1999 ICF Canoe Slalom World Championships in La Seu d'Urgell and also at the 1998 European Championships in Roudnice nad Labem.

Friedli also competed in two Summer Olympics, earning her best finish of ninth in the K1 event in Sydney in 2000.

World Cup individual podiums

References

Sports-reference.com profile

1974 births
Canoeists at the 1996 Summer Olympics
Canoeists at the 2000 Summer Olympics
Living people
Olympic canoeists of Switzerland
Swiss female canoeists
Medalists at the ICF Canoe Slalom World Championships